PDS can refer to:

Entertainment
 Partially Deceased Syndrome, a fictional condition in BBC show In the Flesh
 Panzer Dragoon Saga, a 1998 video game

Computing
 Partitioned data sets, IBM
 Passive data structure, another term for record
 Processor Direct Slot, in some old Macintosh computers
 Personal data service, services to let individuals manage their own personal data by themselves
 Protective distribution system, a safeguarded telecommunication system
 Microsoft BASIC Professional Development System (PDS), a superset of QuickBASIC

Medical
 Paroxysmal depolarizing shift, a pre-seizure interictal neuronal EEG spike in epilepsy.
 Pigment dispersion syndrome, an affliction of the eye
 Polydioxanone, a type of absorbable suture
 Pleomorphic dermal sarcoma, a form of histiocytoma

Political parties
 Party of Democratic Socialism (Partei des Demokratischen Sozialismus), a defunct political party of Germany
 Social Democracy Party of Albania
 Party of Democratic Socialism (India)
 Party of the Sicilians
 Progressive Democrats, a defunct political party of Ireland
 Democratic Party of the Left (Partito Democratico della Sinistra), a defunct political party of Italy
 Senegalese Democratic Party (Parti Démocratique Sénégalais), a political party of Senegal
 Sudanese Democratic Party (Parti Démocratique Soudanais), a defunct political party of Sudan
 Democratic Social Party (Partido Democrático Social), a defunct political party of Brazil
 Prosperous Peace Party (Partai Damai Sejahtera), a political party of Indonesia
 Parti de la Democratie Socialiste, a defunct provincial political party of Quebec, Canada

Schools
 Princeton Day School, New Jersey, US
 Peabody Demonstration School, former school in Nashville, Tennessee, US
 Presbyterian Day School, Memphis, Tennessee, US
 Providence Day School, Charlotte, North Carolina, US
 Patumwan Demonstration School, Srinakharinwirot University, Bangkok, Thailand

Scientific
 Photothermal deflection spectroscopy
 Planetary Data System, a NASA data archive system 
 Polydioxanone, a synthetic polymer
 15-Cis-phytoene desaturase, an enzyme
 Poincaré dodecahedral space

Other
 Particularly Dangerous Situation, in weather watching
 Piedras Negras International Airport, IATA code PDS
 Precision Drill Squad, a skilled military performance of Singapore
 Product design specification
 Public distribution system, Indian food distribution system
 The Philip DeFranco Show, on YouTube
 Permanent Duty Station, in the United States military forces (see temporary duty assignment)